Castaic Power Plant, also known as the Castaic Pumped-Storage Plant, is a seven unit pumped-storage hydroelectric plant, operated by the Los Angeles Department of Water and Power, which provides peak load power from the falling water on the West Branch of the California State Aqueduct. It is a cooperative venture between the  LADWP and the Department of Water Resources of the State of California. An agreement between the two organizations was signed on September 2, 1966, for construction of the project.

Location 

Water supply 
California State Aqueduct water en route to Southern California is pumped up through the Tehachapi Mountains (by the Edmonston Pumping Plant) to the Tehachapi Afterbay. There the aqueduct divides into East and West Branches. The West Branch water is again pumped at the Oso Pumping Plant to Quail Lake, near Highway 138 East of Gorman. From here it flows through a permanent pipeline waterway to Warne Power Plant, which is located at the inlet to Pyramid Lake. The Warne Plant was constructed by the state of California in 1983. Pyramid Lake is the upper forebay for the Castaic Power Plant.

Angeles Tunnel 

The State of California had planned to build a tunnel  in diameter.

Turbines 
The Castaic Power Plant has six reversible 250,000 kilowatt main units and one conventional 55,000 kilowatt auxiliary unit. By comparison the largest generators at Hoover Dam are 130,000 kilowatts. The plant rating is 1,247,000 kilowatts (Nominal installed capacity is higher (over 1,500 MW), however when all main units are operating at full load in generate, they are de-rated by friction losses from the water flow in the Angeles Tunnel). The 55,000 kilowatt unit (Unit 7) was placed in service in February 1972. The unit also serves as a pump-starting unit for the six reversible units. The first main unit became operational in 1973. Unit six, the last unit, was placed in service in 1978. Power is generated at 18,000 volts then stepped up to 230,000 volts to be distributed to various receiving substations in Los Angeles. Each of the six 250,000 kilowatt units function as pumps as well as generators. The turbines/pumps are used a few percent of the time.

Surge chamber 
Visible from Templin Highway and normally mistaken for a water tank, the surge chamber sits at the south end of the Angeles Tunnel. The surge chamber is 120 feet in diameter and 400 feet high with 160 feet visible above ground. The chamber is there to relieve excess pressure in the tunnel and penstocks if the plant were to experience an emergency shutdown of its generators. It also supplies water for quickly starting the plant's generators while water gains speed in the 7 mile long Angeles Tunnel.

Castaic Reservoir 
Water from the Castaic Power Plant is discharged into Elderberry Lake (pumping forebay) from which it can be released into Castaic Lake, created by Castaic Dam. The amount of water in the lake varies with the demand for water delivery from the West Branch of the State Aqueduct.

Pumped-storage operation 
The pumping forebay, which is separated from the main reservoir by a dam located downstream from the Castaic Power Plant, functions in connection with the pumped storage operations of the plant. This assures the availability of at least  of water which can be pumped back to Pyramid Lake by the use of off peak energy when economical to do so. The pumping function at Castaic hydroelectric plant provides additional water for power generation beyond the supply of water available from the flow of the State Aqueduct. The City of Los Angeles has need for capacity to meet its peak requirements ranging from 3 to 6 hours per day in the winter to 6 to 10 hours per day in summer, depending upon climatic conditions. The water which normally flows through the West Branch of the State Aqueduct during off peak periods, is stored in the higher level Pyramid Lake. This water can be channeled through the turbine generators in a very short time to immediately meet short time peak demands on the DWP's electric system. If the need exists for power for longer than normal peak demand periods, extra water can be pumped back to Pyramid Lake from Elderberry Lake to extend the peaking period.

References

External links 

 Image of a worker inspecting 13-foot conduits at the Castaic Hydroelectric Power Plant, California, 1973. Los Angeles Times Photographic Archive (Collection 1429). UCLA Library Special Collections, Charles E. Young Research Library, University of California, Los Angeles.
 Image of three California State Water Project employees picketing Castaic Reservoir, California, 1972. Los Angeles Times Photographic Archive (Collection 1429). UCLA Library Special Collections, Charles E. Young Research Library, University of California, Los Angeles.

Energy infrastructure completed in 1973
Energy infrastructure completed in 1978
Hydroelectric power plants in California
Pumped-storage hydroelectric power stations in the United States